Fudbalski klub Smederevo 1924, commonly known as Smederevo, is a Serbian professional football club based in Smederevo.

During Yugoslavia the club mainly played in amateur ranks of competition.

Sartid Smederevo as the club was known in this era (Srpsko akcionarsko rudarsko topioničarsko industrijsko društvo)  managed to beat Crvena Zvezda 1–0 in the 2002–03 Serbia and Montenegro Cup final at Partizan Stadium, achieving the club's greatest success in its history. Marko Pantelic scoring the winning goal in the 110th minute of the game.

At the start of the year 2000 the club started to become significant within Serbian football and even managed to qualify for UEFA Cup where they had some memorable wins against the likes of Dundee FC, Bangor City, FK Sarajevo, UE Sant Julià. The club also played some big opposition been competitive but eventually losing ties to clubs such as  1860 München, Ipswich Town and Slavia Praha.

The club's most famous European tie came against Ipswich Town FC in the 2002–03 UEFA Cup, following a favourable away result 1–1 in England, Sartid were favourites to go to the next round meaning they just needed to keep a clean sheet at home to progress. However, the combination of Marcus Bent  converting an early 9th-minute penalty and Sartid failing to score for the remainder of the match spelled painful elimination. Even though the club was eliminated, it was still a proud moment for its supporters coming up against an historic English club in Ipswich Town FC.

Key players during this successful era for the club were : Nenad Mirosavljević, Vladimir Mudrinić, Goran Bogdanović and Marko Pantelic.

History
Acting on suggestion from chief engineer Ernest Radlinski, the club was first founded on 6 May 1924 by SARTID (Srpsko akcionarsko rudarsko topioničarsko industrijsko društvo) as FK Sartid. At the beginning, FK Sartid's roster was mostly filled with professional players from Hungary, Austria and Germany and the club failed to make much noise in the Kingdom of Yugoslavia's football scene. Then in 1944, it was essentially disbanded by Yugoslavia's new communist authorities following the end of World War II, along with the entire Sartid factory whose property was nationalized.

Though it is not certain if what followed can be viewed in continuity with FK Sartid, many fans consider it to be a part of club's history, so depending on one's opinion, either a new club appeared or the name was simply changed to FK Metalac in 1944.

The following period was marked by numerous name changes. Two years later in 1946 the name was switched to FK Jedinstvo, and it lasted only three years until 1949 when it was changed to FK Smederevo.

In 1958, FK Smederevo merged with FK Metalac to form OFK Budućnost, the name that stuck around until 1962 when it was switched back to FK Smederevo. That setup lasted until 1967, when the club became FK Metalurg.

In 1976, the name was switched to FK Smederevo for the third time, lasting until the breakup of Yugoslavia in 1992.

All throughout this 48-year period, the club toiled in lower leagues (Serbian regional league, etc.).

FK Sartid was reborn in 1992 when Sartid metallurgical concern took over the club's ownership and sponsorship, and promptly switched to its original name. The renaissance commenced immediately as the club went from Smederevo Zone League to Yugoslav First League in six seasons. The 1998–99 campaign will go down in history as the club's first in top flight. The club's success in this period was tied to their main board president Dušan Matković. In addition to his position at FK Sartid, Matković was also a high-ranking official of Slobodan Milošević's party SPS as well as Minister of Industry in the government of Mirko Marjanović. The allegations that the club was involved in various illegal and irregular activities, and also protected from persecution because of their powerful benefactor, during this period are numerous.

After losing the national cup final to Crvena Zvezda in 2002, the club won the competition against the same opponent in 2003. In the summer of 2004, the club changed its name back to FK Smederevo.

The most noted player is former team captain Goran Bogdanović. He retired after the 2003–04 season.

In summer 2014, FK Smederevo merged with FK Seljak from Mihajlovac to form FK Semendrija 1924. In January 2015, the club changed its name to FK Smederevo 1924. They finished 7th in the 2014–15 Serbian League West.

In the 2018–19 season FK Smederevo 1924 finished first in the Serbian League West and were promoted to the Serbian First League.

Names of the club through history

European seasons

2001–02
The trio of Nenad Mirosavljević (15 league goals), Vladimir Mudrinić (earned a mid-season move to Zenit Saint Petersburg) and Goran Bogdanović led the way on pitch during 2001–02 campaign that, among other things, will be remembered for the absence of now customary mid-season Sartid coaching changes. Head coach Jovica Škoro confidently guided his team to a 3rd place league finish and a Yugoslav Cup final where they were unlucky to lose to the more experienced Red Star side.

On the European front, Sartid competed in UEFA Intertoto Cup where they recorded a memorable first round win versus Dundee (0–0 away, 5–2 at home before 16,000 fans). Unfortunately, the journey ended in second round versus an experienced TSV 1860 München side featuring veterans Thomas Häßler and Vidar Riseth (1–3 away, 2–3 at home).

2002–03
The year that started off in high style almost turned sour towards the end with a string of poor results that sent the team spiraling down the table. Management reacted quickly, sacking coach Škoro in April, and bringing in Milenko Kiković for his second stint with the club. The move paid immediate dividends and relegation was avoided comfortably. And if that wasn't enough cause for celebration, Sartid managed to beat Crvena Zvezda 1–0 in Serbia and Montenegro Cup final at Partizan Stadium, achieving the club's greatest success in history.

Similarly to Sartid's domestic campaign, the year in Europe started off glowingly. They quickly disposed of Welsh side Bangor City to reach the UEFA Cup first round where Ipswich Town was waiting. The hopes were further raised following a favourable away result 1–1, meaning they just needed to keep a clean sheet at home to progress. However, the combination of Marcus Bent converting an early 9th-minute penalty and Sartid failing to score for the remainder of the match spelled painful elimination.

2003–04
The 2003–04 campaign was another fairly stable season in top league result wise. Though as usual not on the coaching front. New head coach Ratko Dostanić, brought in before the season, started off tremendously. In UEFA Cup, he led the squad to a memorable win in a tie against Sarajevo. With Dostanić firmly in charge, Sartid's form continued in the domestic league, too. At the midway point of the season Sartid was sitting in third place, just behind Belgrade powerhouses Crvena Zvezda and Partizan. During the winter break, Dostanić wanted the team captain Goran Bogdanović promoted to the role of technical director, but new club president Thomas Kelly would have none of it so Dostanić decided to leave. In January 2004, Zvonko Varga was appointed as a new coach, but he left the club after only few matches. Afterwards, old face Milenko Kiković was brought back to coach and he managed to complete a successful season for the club.

2004–05
The following 2004–05 season was not nearly as happy. It started off alright with demolition of lowly Andorran side Sant Julià in Intertoto Cup first round, but the painful next round exit at the hands of Dinamo Minsk turned out to be ominous. All throughout the domestic campaign Smederevo battled relegation threat. During the winter break coach Kiković resigned leaving the team in 10th place with 17 points. New head coach Tomislav Sivić managed to narrowly keep the club in top flight.

2005–06
The 2005–06 season has been another difficult one for the club. The embarrassing Intertoto Cup first round exit to Prilep's Pobeda was a sign of things to come. After managing only 13 points from 11 league matches, head coach Tomislav Sivić resigned on 1 November 2005 in the wake of the team's third straight league loss. Following a period under a caretaker, club appointed Spaniard Jaume Bauzà on 28 November 2005. Though the team's overall play somewhat improved, it was enough to avoid relegation at the end of the season.

Season-by-season record

Key

League
P = Matches played
W = Matches won
D = Matches drawn
L = Matches lost
F = Goals for
A = Goals against
Pts = Points won
Pos = Final position

Serbia
Div 1 = Serbian SuperLiga
Div 2 = Serbian First League
Div 3 = Serbian League West
Cup = Serbian Cup

Cup / Europe
N/A = Was not held
— = Did not compete
QR = Qualifying round
PR = Play-off round
R1 = First round
R2 = Second round
QF = Quarter-final
SF = Semi-final
F = Final/Runner-up
W = Competition won

Seasons

UEFA competitions

Stadium

Smederevo's stadium is one of the most modern stadiums in Serbia. The stadium can hold up to 17,200 spectators. It also has one of the best pitches in the country. It was first built in 1930, but it was greatly expanded into a modern-day stadium in 2000.

Supporters
The supporters of FK Smederevo are known as Despoti (The Despots).

Current squad

Out on loan

For recent transfers, see List of Serbian football transfers summer 2019 and List of Serbian football transfers winter 2019–20.

Notable players
Below are the notable players who have represented the club in national and international competitions since the club's foundation in 1924. To appear in the section below, a player must have played in at least 100 league matches for the club, at least 50 league matches for the club and have at least 1 appearance for their national team, or have at least 5 appearances for their national team.

For a list of all Smederevo players with a Wikipedia article, please see: :Category:FK Smederevo players.

Managerial history

Honours
Serbia and Montenegro Cup
 2002–03

Second League of FR Yugoslavia
 1996–97 (Group West)

Serbian League West
 2018–19

Kit manufacturers and shirt sponsors

See also
List of football clubs in Serbia

References

External links

 Profile club www.uefa.com 
 Profile, results and tables club www.srbijasport.net 
 Profile, results and tables club (youth) www.srbijasport.net 

 
Football clubs in Serbia
Association football clubs established in 1924
1924 establishments in Serbia
Works association football clubs in Serbia